Mistshenkoana is a genus of crickets in the subfamily Podoscirtinae and tribe Aphonoidini.  Species can be found in tropical southeast Asia through to Australia and western Pacific islands.

Species 
Mistshenkoana includes the following species:

Mistshenkoana abbreviata Gorochov, 2007
Mistshenkoana anatom Gorochov, 2008
Mistshenkoana angustifrons Chopard, 1930
Mistshenkoana anisyutkini Gorochov, 2007
Mistshenkoana aperta Gorochov, 2007
Mistshenkoana asymmetrica Gorochov, 2008
Mistshenkoana baduri Gorochov, 2008
Mistshenkoana belokobylskiji Gorochov, 1992
Mistshenkoana beybienkoi Gorochov, 1990
Mistshenkoana borneo Gorochov, 2007
Mistshenkoana buonluoi Gorochov, 2007
Mistshenkoana caudatus Bey-Bienko, 1966
Mistshenkoana chopardi Bey-Bienko, 1966
Mistshenkoana decora Gorochov, 2008
Mistshenkoana designata Gorochov, 2008
Mistshenkoana discreta Gorochov, 2007
Mistshenkoana erromango Gorochov, 2008
Mistshenkoana fijiensis Gorochov, 1990
Mistshenkoana gracilis Chopard, 1925
Mistshenkoana hulu Gorochov, 2007
Mistshenkoana kisarani Gorochov, 2007
Mistshenkoana kolobagara Gorochov, 2008
Mistshenkoana kongtumensis Gorochov, 1990 - type species
Mistshenkoana kukum Gorochov, 2008
Mistshenkoana lata Gorochov, 2008
Mistshenkoana longa Gorochov, 2008
Mistshenkoana malakula Gorochov, 2008
Mistshenkoana nhachangi Gorochov, 2007
Mistshenkoana nigrifrons Gorochov, 2007
Mistshenkoana ornata Gorochov, 2007
Mistshenkoana ounua Gorochov, 2008
Mistshenkoana ouveus Otte, 1987
Mistshenkoana padangi Gorochov, 2007
Mistshenkoana pangrango Gorochov, 2007
Mistshenkoana pileata Gorochov, 2008
Mistshenkoana polyphemus Gorochov, 2008
Mistshenkoana propria Gorochov, 2007
Mistshenkoana proxima Gorochov, 2007
Mistshenkoana ralum Gorochov, 2008
Mistshenkoana rennell Gorochov, 2008
Mistshenkoana reticulata Gorochov, 2007
Mistshenkoana rufa Gorochov, 2008
Mistshenkoana sharovi Gorochov, 1990
Mistshenkoana solomonica Gorochov, 2008
Mistshenkoana sumbawae Gorochov, 2007
Mistshenkoana surda Chopard, 1929
Mistshenkoana symmetrica Gorochov, 2008
Mistshenkoana tembelingi Gorochov, 2007
Mistshenkoana uniformis Gorochov, 2008
Mistshenkoana vanuatu Gorochov, 2008
Mistshenkoana vitiensis Saussure, 1878
Mistshenkoana weta Otte & Alexander, 1983

References

External links
 

Ensifera genera
Crickets
Orthoptera of Asia